Jazza may refer to:

 Jazza Dickens, British professional boxer
 Jazza (YouTuber), Josiah Brooks, Australian YouTuber artist
 Big Jazza McClone, a character referred to in the BBC 1987 television serial Tutti Frutti

See also 
 JAZA, Japanese Association of Zoos and Aquariums
 JASA (disambiguation)
 Jazz (disambiguation)
 Jazzah, album by Jan Akkerman